Corkickle railway station is a railway station serving the suburb of Corkickle near Whitehaven in Cumbria, England. It is owned by Network Rail and managed by Northern Trains. The station opened on 3 December 1855, and is at the southern end of the  tunnel from Whitehaven. Between 1855 and 1957, the station was known as Whitehaven Corkickle.

Facilities
The station building survives as a private residence. The station is a single platform and has shelters, display information and disabled access.

Services

Monday to Saturdays there is hourly  service northbound to Carlisle and southbound to Barrow-in-Furness. There are no trains after 21:00 on Mondays-Saturdays, but since the May 2018 timetable change a Sunday service now operates (for the first time since 1976) from mid-morning until early evening.

Freight
The area immediately south of the station was for many years a busy freight location, handling haematite ore traffic from Moor Row mine as well as chemical tankers up & down the incline at the nearby Preston Street goods depot (the one time W&FJR passenger terminus) and associated yard. Two signal boxes (Corkickle No. 1 & No. 2) supervised the sidings, as well as controlling access to and from the incline and the Moor Row branch (the surviving portion of the former Whitehaven, Cleator and Egremont Railway line to Egremont & Sellafield).  Although sufficiently busy to require its own resident shunting locomotive well into the 1970s, the gradual loss of traffic from the early 1980s onwards saw facilities run down and following the demise of Preston Street depot, the yard eventually closed (along with both signal boxes, which had been replaced by standard LMR-designed structures in 1958–59) on 15/16 February 1997.  Today no trace remains of the sidings or either signal box, only the one surviving running line southwards towards St Bees & Sellafield.

The Corkickle Brake

In 1881 the Corkickle Brake, a roped incline  in length and with gradients of between 1 in 5.2 and 1 in 6.6  was built from the Furness Railway main line, a short distance to the south of Corkickle station, to the Earl of Lonsdale's Croft Pit.

The 'brake' closed in 1931 due to the worsening financial situation of the colliery's owners, Lonsdale's Whitehaven Colliery Co. In May 1955, the incline was re-opened, this time to serve the factory of Marchon Products -  a subsidiary of Albright and Wilson - at Kells. It was used mainly to haul rail tanker wagons containing sulphuric acid from the main line - by now in the ownership of British Railways - to the Marchon factory. The Corkickle Brake closed for good on 31 October 1986 when it was the last commercial roped incline in Britain. The task of transporting acid and other chemicals was taken over by road tankers.

References

Sources

British Railways London Midland Region Passenger Timetable, 16 September 1957 to 8 June 1958.
GB Rail Timetable Winter Edition 13 December 2009 - 22 May 2010.
Hyde, M. and Pevsner, N The Buildings of England: Cumbria. Yale University Press 2010. 
Joy, D. Cumbrian Coast Railways. Dalesman Publishing 1968.
Joy, D. A Regional History of the Railways of Great Britain, Volume 14: The Lake Counties.  David and Charles 1983. 
Mountford, C.E. Rope and Chain Haulage - The Forgotten Element of Railway History. Industrial Railway Society, 2013.  
Quayle, H. Whitehaven - The Railways and Waggonways of a Unique Cumberland Port. Cumbrian Railways Association 2006. 

Routledge, A.W. Marchon - The Whtehaven Chemical Works. Tempus, 2005.

External links

 
 

Railway stations in Cumbria
DfT Category F2 stations
Former Furness Railway stations
Railway stations in Great Britain opened in 1855
Northern franchise railway stations
Whitehaven